Lolianwala is a village of Mandi Bahauddin District in the Punjab province of Pakistan. Its name has been changed as " KOT NOOR SHAH " with reference of shrine of Syed Noor Hussain Shah. It is located at 32°40'0N 73°34'0E at an altitude of 224 meters (738 feet).

References

Villages in Mandi Bahauddin District